The 2020 Fiji Senior League is the second-highest division within the Fiji football league system after the Fiji Premier League in Fiji Senior League (Vodafone Senior League for sponsorship reasons). It is currently contested by 11 teams with two groups of 5 and 6 teams and is run and overseen by the Fiji Football Association.

Teams
A total of eleven teams compete in the league in two groups of five and six teams each

Viti Levu Zone 
Nadroga 
Tavua 
Northland Tailevu 
Rakiraki 
Tailevu Naitasiri

Vanua Levu Zone  
Bua
Dreketi  
Nadogo  
Seaqaqa  
Savusavu  
Taveuni

League table

Viti Levu Zone

Vanua Levu Zone

Results

Viti Levu Zone

Vanua Levu Zone

Play-Offs
The play-offs will be played between the top one of each group, which will be Bua vs Nadroga, The winner is be promoted to 2021 Fiji Premier League.

Top scorers

Top scorers

Awards
 Champion of the Day - Shafil Irsaz Ali of Nadogo

See also 
 2019 Vodafone Senior League
 Fiji Senior League
 2020 Fiji Premier League

References

External links

Football leagues in Fiji
Fiji
Senior League